Bosskey is an Indian actor, Radio Jockey, Cricketer, Television anchor, stand-up comedian and film critic working in the Tamil film (Kollywood) and media industry. He has anchored TV shows such as Hari Giri Assembly (1000 daily comedy interviews) and Siri Giri Station in Jaya TV and appeared in 18 Tamil films in comedy and character roles. He presented Sollunga Boss program (1000 shows) in Sun TV and Kashayam with Bosskey a Tamil cinema review program (300 film reviews) in YouTube's Indiaglitz Tamil channel. He has presented around 5000 radio shows in Radio Mirchi, Big FM and Suryan FM. He has also written 17000 jokes for Ananda Vikatan magazine. He also ran Giri Giri column in Ananda Vikatan. He hosted as a Stand-up comedian in Idhu Epdi Irukku show in Vijay TV. He also worked as an anchorman for Kishkinta's Manthira Arai. Bosskey's Indepth and Troll review of IPL 2020 can be seen on Behindwoods Air, YouTube channel after the end of every single match and the show is received well amongst the Tamil cricket fans

Filmography

References

External links
 Bosskey on Twitter

Living people
Indian male television actors
Male actors in Tamil cinema
1962 births
Tamil comedians
Indian male comedians
Tamil male actors
21st-century Indian male actors